Patrick P. Cromwell (1942 – 9 November 2002) was an Irish Gaelic footballer who played for club side Skryne and at inter-county level with the Meath senior football team. He usually lined out as a goalkeeper.

Honours

Skryne
Meath Senior Football Championship: 1965

Meath
All-Ireland Senior Football Championship: 1967
Leinster Senior Football Championship: 1964, 1966, 1967

References

1942 births
2002 deaths
Skryne Gaelic footballers
Meath inter-county Gaelic footballers
Winners of one All-Ireland medal (Gaelic football)
Gaelic football goalkeepers